The Deadly Assassin is the third serial of the 14th season of the British science fiction television programme Doctor Who, which was first broadcast in four weekly parts on BBC1 from 30 October to 20 November 1976. It is the first serial in which the Doctor is featured without a companion, and the only such story for the classic era.

In the serial, the renegade alien Time Lord the Master (Peter Pratt) seeks to restore his life force by disrupting a power source that would destroy the planet Gallifrey along with his archenemy the Fourth Doctor (Tom Baker).

Plot

The Fourth Doctor has a precognitive vision about the President of the Time Lords being assassinated. The Doctor goes to Gallifrey to stop the assassination. At the Panopticon, a Gallifreyan ceremonial chamber, he notes a camera stationed on an unguarded catwalk. He also spots a sniper rifle next to the camera. The Doctor fights his way to the catwalk, warning that the President is about to be killed. Unbeknownst to the Doctor, the assassin is among the delegates and shoots the President dead. However, the crowd sees the Doctor on the catwalk with the rifle and assumes he is the killer.

Under interrogation, the Doctor maintains that he has been framed. Eventually, Castellan Spandrell starts to believe him and orders Engin to assist him in an independent investigation. To delay his possible execution, the Doctor invokes Article 17 and announces that he will run for President, which guarantees liberty for those running for office during the course of an election.

The Doctor realises that it was the Master who had sent him the premonition of the assassination through the Matrix, a vast electronic neural network which can turn thought patterns into virtual reality. He decides to enter the Matrix to track the Master. In the Matrix, the Doctor confronts an assassin who eventually reveals himself as Chancellor Goth. The Master, realising that Goth has been effectively defeated, tries to trap the Doctor in the Matrix by overloading the neuron fields. Engin gets the Doctor out of the Matrix, but Goth is fatally burnt.

The Doctor and Spandrell, accompanied by soldiers, make their way to the chamber where the Master and Goth were accessing the Matrix. They find the Master without a pulse and Goth dying. Goth reveals that he found the Master, near death, on Tersurus. The Master was nearing the end of his final regeneration. Goth went along with his schemes mainly for power: he knew the President had no intention of naming him as a successor, but if a new election was held, Goth would be the front-runner. Before he dies, Goth warns that the Master has a doomsday plan.

Attempting to piece together what the Master and Goth were planning, the Doctor inquires as to what becoming the President entails. He is told that the President has access to the symbols of office: the Sash and Great Key of Rassilon. As Engin plays records that describe how Rassilon found the Eye of Harmony within the "black void," the Doctor realises these objects are not merely ceremonial. He also realises that the Master injected himself with a neural inhibitor that mimics a deathlike state and is still alive.

The Doctor, Spandrell, and Engin arrive at the morgue to find that the Master has revived. The Master seizes the Sash from the President's corpse and traps the three in the morgue. The Doctor explains that the Eye is actually the nucleus of a black hole, an inexhaustible energy source that Rassilon captured to power Gallifrey; the Sash and Key are its control devices. The Doctor deduces that the Master was planning to steal this energy to gain a new cycle of regenerations; however, if the Eye is disrupted, Gallifrey will be destroyed and a hundred other worlds will be consumed in a chain reaction.

Inside the Panopticon, the Master makes his way to the obelisk containing the Eye. He unhooks the coils that connect it to Gallifrey and is prepared to access the energy. The Doctor makes his way to the Panopticon via a service shaft. The Citadel begins to quake, and cracks appear in the floor. The Doctor and the Master fight, until the Master loses his footing and falls into a chasm. The Doctor reconnects the coils and saves Gallifrey, although half the city is in ruins and many lives have been lost.

The Doctor is now free to return to his TARDIS. He bids farewell but also warns that the Master may not be dead as he had harvested energy from the obelisk before he was stopped and may have been able to channel it. As the Doctor's TARDIS dematerialises, Spandrell and Engin witness the Master sneak into his own TARDIS and escape.

Production
Following Elisabeth Sladen's departure, Tom Baker told producer Philip Hinchcliffe that he wanted to do a story without a companion. Robert Holmes said that it was difficult to write the script for The Deadly Assassin without anyone for the Doctor to share his thoughts and plans with, which was the usual role of the companion. Working titles for this story included The Dangerous Assassin (which Holmes changed to "deadly" because he thought it "didn't sound right"). The final title is a tautology: a successful assassin must, by definition, be deadly. However, since Time Lords can in general survive death, and the assassin's victims do not, he is perhaps "deadly" in that sense. According to the text commentary on the DVD, Holmes argued that the title was not a tautology, stating that there were plenty of incompetent assassins.

Cast notes
Bernard Horsfall guest stars as Chancellor Goth. He had previously appeared as an unnamed Time Lord (credited as 'Time Lord 1') in the serial The War Games (1969); extended media have since stated they are the same character. Other parts played by Horsfall in Doctor Who were Gulliver in The Mind Robber (1968) and Taron in Planet of the Daleks (1973), all of which were directed by David Maloney. Angus MacKay later played the Headmaster in Mawdryn Undead (1983). George Pravda previously played Denes in The Enemy of the World (1967–68) and Jaeger in The Mutants (1972). Hugh Walters previously played William Shakespeare in The Chase (1965) and later appeared as Vogel in Revelation of the Daleks (1985).

Peter Pratt, who plays the Master, was previously a leading man with the D'Oyly Carte Opera Company and a radio actor.

Broadcast and reception

The cliffhanger to Part Three—where Goth holds the Doctor's head underwater in an attempt to drown him—came in for heavy criticism, particularly from the 'clean-up TV' campaigner Mary Whitehouse. She often cited it in interviews as one of the most frightening scenes in Doctor Who, her reasoning being that children would not know if the Doctor survived until the following week and that they would "have this strong image in their minds" during all that time. After the episode's initial broadcast, the BBC apologised to Whitehouse and the master tape was edited to remove the original ending. The edited episode was included when the story was repeated on BBC1 from 4 to 25 August 1977 seen by 4.4, 2.6, 3.8 & 3.5 million viewers.

Paul Cornell, Martin Day and Keith Topping wrote of the serial in The Discontinuity Guide (1995), "The reputation of The Deadly Assassin rests with its violence and its revelations about the Doctor's people and their culture. Politically literate and cynical ('We must adjust the truth'), the serial is the definitive text on the Time Lords. The Doctor's journey into the APC net ... is a visual and intellectual tour de force of hallucinatory images." In The Television Companion (1998), David J. Howe and Stephen James Walker reported that at the time of broadcast several viewers took issue with the serial's portrayal of the Time Lords, finding it a contradiction of the small details that had previously been dropped about the Doctor's home planet, but over time its reputation became more positive. The pair themselves called it "a truly remarkable story" and praised the reintroduction of the Master. In 2010, Patrick Mulkern of Radio Times awarded the serial four stars out of five. He described "the Master's putrid skull and split bangers for fingers" as "the most revolting images presented on teatime TV" but was positive towards its supporting characters, though he did criticise the Matrix sequences for being more earthly rather than alien, despite them being constructed from deceased Time Lords. The A.V. Club reviewer Christopher Bahn praised the plotting and Matrix sequences, calling it "well-crafted all around". 

In 2010, Charlie Jane Anders of io9 listed the cliffhanger to the first episode—in which it appears the Doctor shoots the president—as one of the greatest cliffhangers in the history of Doctor Who. Den of Geek named the cliffhanger to the third episode as one of the ten best Doctor Who cliffhangers, praising the freeze frame. In 2013, Starburst also chose Part Three as one of the "Top Ten Doctor Who Cliffhangers". In 2018, Digital Spy described Part Three as "the show's most controversial cliffhanger".

Analysis

Tat Wood suggests it is "blindingly obvious" that the story was largely inspired by the film and book The Manchurian Candidate.

Commercial releases

In print

A novelisation of this serial, written by Terrance Dicks, was published by Target Books in October 1977, entitled Doctor Who and The Deadly Assassin.

Home media
This story was released on VHS in March 1989 in edited omnibus format in the US only. It was released on VHS in episodic format in the UK in October 1991. It was also re-released and remastered for the WHSmith-exclusive Time Lord Collection in 2002 with a better-quality freeze-frame cliffhanger for Episode 3. The Deadly Assassin was released on 11 May 2009 on Region 2 DVD. The serial was released in issue 52 of the Doctor Who DVD Files on 29 December 2010.

It was released on Blu-Ray as part of the Time Lord Victorious box set.

See also
Simulated reality

References

External links

Target novelisation

Fourth Doctor serials
Television episodes about virtual reality
Doctor Who serials novelised by Terrance Dicks
The Master (Doctor Who) television stories
1976 British television episodes
Television episodes about elections